is a passenger railway station in located in the city of Shima,  Mie Prefecture, Japan, operated by the private railway operator Kintetsu Railway.

Lines
Kaminogō Station is served by the Shima Line, and is located 56.1 rail kilometers from the terminus of the line at Ise-Nakagawa Station.

Station layout
The station consists of a single island platform with a level crossing. There is no station building, but only a small open shelter built directly on the platform. The station is unattended.

Platforms

Adjacent stations

History
The line was one of six private companies consolidated into Mie Kotsu by order of the Japanese government on February 11, 1944. When Mie Kotsu dissolved on February 1, 1964, the station became part of the Mie Electric Railway, which was then acquired by Kintetsu on April 1, 1965. The station was renamed to its present name on March 1, 1970.

Passenger statistics
In fiscal 2019, the station was used by an average of 47 passengers daily (boarding passengers only).

Surrounding area
National Route 167

See also
List of railway stations in Japan

References

External links

Kintetsu: Kaminogō Station  

Railway stations in Japan opened in 1929
Railway stations in Mie Prefecture
Stations of Kintetsu Railway
Shima, Mie